James Cressett or Cresset (c. 1655 – 26 July 1710) was an English diplomat.

Cressett was the son of James Cressett, Rector of Cound. In April 1671, aged 16,he matriculated at Oriel College, Oxford, gaining a B.A. in 1673-4 and an M.A. in 1677. In 1686 he joined Trinity College, Cambridge, and was a Fellow of Trinity Hall, Cambridge from 1690 to 1696. From 1693 to 1703 he was Envoy Extraordinary to Hanover.

References

External links

1650s births
1710 deaths
Fellows of Trinity Hall, Cambridge
Alumni of Oriel College, Oxford
Ambassadors of England to Denmark
17th-century English diplomats